Kwame Asare, best known as Jacob Sam (1903 on the Cape Coast – 1950s), was the first to record Ghanaian highlife music and was the first highlife guitarist.

Life and career 
He was a trained goldsmith. He moved to Kumasi and formed the Kumasi Trio. He was taught guitar by a Liberian seaman. He is known to be the first Ghanaian to record highlife music in Ghana known as "Yaa Amponsah". In 1928, on Zonophone in London's Kingsway Hall EZ series, he recorded guitar-band highlife classic music with his melodic and finger-style guitar picking. He was accompanied by the Kumasi Trio, featuring guitarist H.E. Binney and percussionist Kwah Kanta.

Under the name "Kwanin" he recorded his voice over on the JZ series. His recordings in 1928 were in Fante languages. He pioneered the roots of Central African music's with gutsy, baritone vocals, and lyrics in the Fante language.

Death
Asare died in the 1950s.

References 

Ghanaian highlife musicians
1903 births
1950s deaths
Year of death uncertain